Andrea Magrassi (born 6 February 1993) is an Italian professional footballer who plays as a forward for  club Cittadella.

Career
Born in Dolo, the Province of Venice, Veneto, Magrassi started his career at A.C. Marco Polo, located in Mestre, the mainland part of the municipality of Venice. He then played for Venice and Brescia Calcio (ca. 2009–12). Magrassi made his Serie B debut for Brescia on 13 November 2011 against Ascoli. He substituted Denis Maccan in the second half.

Sampdoria
On 30 January 2012, Magrassi joined Sampdoria outright, but effective on 1 July 2012. That transfer window Brescia signed forwards Federico Piovaccari and Salvatore Foti in temporary deal from Sampdoria; defender Pietro Accardi in definitive deal, for free. In the other hand, Sampdoria signed forwards Magrassi (€2 million), Juan Antonio (€3 million ) and defender Gaetano Berardi (€2 million ) from Brescia. Magrassi signed a -year contract.

On 2 August 2012, he left for Portogruaro. On 30 August 2013 he left for Real Vicenza.

On 1 September 2014, he was signed by Martina Franca in a temporary deal.

Olhanense
On 31 August 2015, Magrassi was sold to Portuguese Second Division club Olhanense.

Virtus Entella
On 31 January 2019, he joined Cavese on loan.

On 30 July 2019, he moved to Virtus Verona on loan.

On 21 September 2020 he joined Serie C club Pontedera on a season-long loan.

Cittadella
On 31 August 2022, Magrassi signed with Cittadella.

References

External links
 AIC profile (data by football.it) 
 

1993 births
Living people
People from Dolo
Sportspeople from the Metropolitan City of Venice
Italian footballers
Association football forwards
Serie B players
Serie C players
Venezia F.C. players
Brescia Calcio players
U.C. Sampdoria players
A.S.D. Portogruaro players
Real Vicenza V.S. players
A.S.D. Martina Calcio 1947 players
A.C. Mestre players
A.S. Ostia Mare Lido Calcio players
S.S. Matelica Calcio 1921 players
Virtus Entella players
Ravenna F.C. players
Cavese 1919 players
Virtus Verona players
U.S. Città di Pontedera players
A.S. Cittadella players
Liga Portugal 2 players
S.C. Olhanense players
Italian expatriate footballers
Italian expatriate sportspeople in Portugal
Expatriate footballers in Portugal
Footballers from Veneto